Nous is the sixth studio album by Québécois singer and musician Daniel Bélanger, and was released in 2009. It was a Juno Award nominee for Francophone Album of the Year at the Juno Awards of 2011.

Track listing
Reste - 6:18
Facile - 3:45
Qui ne suis-je? - 3:27
Si l'amour te ressemblait - 6:28
Jamais loin - 3:17
Le toit du monde - 5:23
Céleste - 3:19
Impossible - 2:39
J'aime ton soleil - 2:46
L'équivalence des contraires - 5:46
Roule - 4:33
Mieux vaut voler - 8:00
Tu peux partir - 4:04

References

2009 albums
Daniel Bélanger albums
Audiogram (label) albums